Emyr Phillips (born 22 February 1987) is a retired former Wales international rugby union player. He played most of his career as Hooker for the Scarlets having previously played  for Llandovery RFC and Llanelli RFC.

In March 2012 Phillips was part of a Scarlets Rugby side that reached the semi-final of the 2012 Anglo Welsh Cup. He made three starts and four appearances in the tournament. Scarlets were beaten in the semi-final by English side Northampton Saints. However reaching that stage was the second best finish in the Anglo-Welsh Cup on record, for the Welsh side. Their final loss to Wasps in 2006 the only better result.

Phillips has scored 21 tries in 282 appearances for Llandovery and the Scarlets. He won the first of three international caps for Wales against Japan in 2013.

He retired at the conclusion of the 2017–18 Pro14 Rugby Union season.

References

External links
 Scarlets Profile
 Llandovery profile

1987 births
Living people
Rugby union players from Llandovery
Scarlets players
Wales international rugby union players
Welsh rugby union players
Rugby union hookers